Jago Pakistan Jago was a Pakistani daytime television programme broadcast on Hum TV presented by Fahad Mustafa (2008–14) and Sanam Jung (2014-18). The show aired from Monday to Friday.

History 
From 2005 to 2008, Morning with Hum was presented by actress Ghazal Siddiqui. After her departure, Sanam Baloch hosted the show for a year. The show was then re-branded as Jago Pakistan Jago. Fahad Mustafa, who had a co-host since the start, left in 2014.

Sanam Jung came on as a host from 1 September 2014 and quickly became public's favorite host. She had to take month-long maternity leave at the end of the year.  Sadia Imam hosted the show during the break. Sanam Jung came back in February 2017 and hosted the show till the last episode on 30 November 2018.

Jago Pakistan Jago concluded on 30 November 2018, after 13 years of telecast. No reason was given for this abrupt end. The show ended with a grand episode remembering everything from the past.

References

External links

Pakistani television series
Hum TV original programming
Television shows set in Karachi
2011 Pakistani television series debuts